This is a tally of newspaper and magazine endorsements in the 2015 Canadian federal election. Endorsements are organized by ownership and/or publisher, as the owner sometimes sets the endorsement policy of the paper, occasionally overriding the editorial board.

Endorsing the Conservative Party

Endorsing the NDP

Endorsing the Liberal Party

Endorsing the Bloc Québécois

Endorsing multiple parties

Explicitly endorsing no party

See also
Endorsements from individuals and organizations in the 2015 Canadian federal election
Newspaper endorsements in the Canadian federal election, 2019
Newspaper endorsements in the Canadian federal election, 2011
Newspaper endorsements in the Canadian federal election, 2008
Newspaper endorsements in the Canadian federal election, 2006

References

2015 Canadian federal election
Newspaper endorsements
Political endorsements in Canada